Opecoelina is a genus of trematodes in the family Opecoelidae.

Species
Opecoelina dewegeri Mago Guevara & Chinchilla Martínez, 2003
Opecoelina helicoleni Manter, 1934
Opecoelina pacifica Manter, 1940
Opecoelina scorpaenae Manter, 1934

References

Opecoelidae
Plagiorchiida genera